Helias Catholic High School is a private, Roman Catholic high school in Jefferson City, Missouri, United States.

History
Helias High School opened for the 1956-57 school year. This interparish Catholic school became necessary when St. Peter High School (built in 1930) was sorely overtaxed by the baby boom in this area after World War II. Named after the Jesuit missionary Ferdinand Helias, the school was designed for 600 students and located on Swifts Highway. It was staffed by the Christian Brothers , School Sisters of Notre Dame, diocesan priests and lay-staffers. Until 1969, Helias was co-institutional, meaning that the boys and girls had separate classes. The sisters taught the girls and the brothers taught the boys. In 1971, James L. Rackers was the first layman to direct a Catholic school. In 2010, Helias High School changed its name to Helias Catholic.

Notable alumni
 John Daly, PGA Tour player - twice major champion
 Hale Hentges, former NFL player for the Washington Redskins
 Sam LeCure, former MLB player (Cincinnati Reds)
 Jon Staggers, former NFL player
 Jamaal Tatum, former Southern Illinois player, class of '03
 Carl Vogel, former Missouri State Senator
 Pope Francis, current Roman Catholic Pope
 Tony Fadell, American inventor and business owner
 Becky G, English pop singer
 Beth Phillips, Judge of the United States District Court for the Western District of Missouri

References

Roman Catholic Diocese of Jefferson City
Catholic secondary schools in Missouri
Lasallian schools in the United States
Buildings and structures in Jefferson City, Missouri
Educational institutions established in 1956
High schools in Cole County, Missouri
1956 establishments in Missouri